Maletswai Local Municipality is a now defunct administrative area in the Joe Gqabi District of the Eastern Cape in South Africa. The municipality was merged with Gariep Local Municipality immediately after the August 2016 Local Municipal Elections to form the new Walter Sisulu Local Municipality.

Maletswai is a Sesotho name that means "a place of salt". The thermal springs resort, named Aliwal Spa, is located within the municipal area and produces salty water, rich in minerals, from underground. During 2010-2014 this once beautiful resort was re-constructed and opened to the public again in 2015.

Main places
The 2011 census divided the municipality into the following main places:

Neighbours
The neighbours of Maletswai Local Municipality in the Joe Gqabi District Municipality (DC14) are:
 Gariep Local Municipality to the West and
 Senqu Local Municipality to the East.

South of Maletswai lies the Chris Hani District Municipality (DC13) with:
 Lukhanji (Queenstown) and
 Inkwanca (Molteno).

On the Free State side is Mohokare Local Municipality in the Xhariep District Municipality (DC16).

Politics 
The municipal council consisted of twelve members elected by mixed-member proportional representation. Six councillors were elected by first-past-the-post voting in six wards, while the remaining six were chosen from party lists so that the total number of party representatives is proportional to the number of votes received. In the election of 18 May 2011 the African National Congress (ANC) won a majority of nine seats on the council.
The following table shows the results of the election.

References

External links
 Official website

Former local municipalities of South Africa